A list of films produced by the Bollywood film industry based in Mumbai in 1994.

Highest-grossing films

The top films released in 1994 by worldwide gross are as follows:

1994 A-Z

Dubbed films

References

External links
 Bollywood films of 1994 at the Internet Movie Database

1994
Lists of 1994 films by country or language
1994 in Indian cinema